The Kentish Manor Murders is a 1988 mystery detective novel by the British writer Julian Symons. A pastiche of the traditional Sherlock Holmes stories by Arthur Conan Doyle, it is a sequel to the 1975 novel A Three-Pipe Problem.

Plot
Sheridan Haynes, now famous for playing Holmes in a series of television adaptations, is invited to Castle Baskerville by Warren Waymark to perform some scenes in character. The eccentric millionaire Waymark, a fanatical Sherlockian, is a collector of anything related to the detective. Before his visit, Haynes is approached by a man claiming to have a genuine copy of previously unknown original Doyle story which he wants to sell to Waymark.

References

Bibliography
Reilly, John M. Twentieth Century Crime & Mystery Writers. Springer, 2015. p. 300. . .</ref>

 Walsdorf, John J. & Allen, Bonnie J. Julian Symons: A Bibliography. Oak Knoll Press, 1996.

1988 British novels
Novels by Julian Symons
British detective novels
British crime novels
British mystery novels
Novels set in London
Macmillan Publishers books
Sherlock Holmes novels
Sherlock Holmes pastiches
Sequel novels